Sukiya (すき家, stylized as SUKIYA) is the largest chain of gyūdon (beef bowl) restaurant in Japan. Sukiya's owner, Zensho Holdings, is listed on the Tokyo Stock Exchange and had sales of ¥511 billion in 2016. Its slogan (printed in English outside the restaurant) is "save time and money." According to MONOSHIRI Japan, it originated in Yokohama, Kanagawa.  Unlike Yoshinoya, Sukiya did not stop serving gyūdon during the ban on American beef imports, instead switching to beef imported from Australia. 

In response to Yoshinoya's butadon (pork bowl, a substitute for gyūdon, "beef bowl"), Sukiya began serving its own version, tondon. On September 11, 2013, a Sukiya restaurant was opened in Mexico City, being the first to be opened in Mexico. The Zona Rosa restaurant offers 24/7 service. On July 3, 2014, a Sukiya restaurant was soft opened in Taipei City, making it the first Sukiya in Taiwan.

Locations

See also
Donburi
Yakiniku
Matsuya
Yoshinoya

References

External links
 Sukiya.jp
 Sukiya Brazil
 Sukiya Mexico
Sukiya Singapore

Fast-food chains of Japan